is a Japanese manga series written and illustrated by Yukinobu Hoshino. It was serialized in Kodansha's seinen manga magazine Mr. Magazine from 1991 to 1992, with its chapters collected in two tankōbon volumes. A sequel, titled Blue World, was serialized in Monthly Afternoon from 1995 to 1997, with its chapters collected in four volumes. The story is about the discovery of a gateway in time and space deep underwater which allows for travel between the present day and the age of the dinosaurs.

Publication
Written and illustrated by Yukinobu Hoshino, Blue Hole was serialized in Kodansha's seinen manga magazine  from 1991 to 1992. Kodansha collected its chapters in two tankōbon volumes, released on August 8, 1992, and February 3, 1993.

A sequel, titled , was serialized in Monthly Afternoon from 1995 to 1997. Kodansha collected its chapters in four tankōbon volumes, released from April 23, 1996, to April 23, 1998.

Blue Hole

Blue World

References

Further reading

External links
 

Adventure anime and manga
Dinosaurs in anime and manga
Kodansha manga
Science fiction anime and manga
Seinen manga